The Attachment Unit Interface (AUI) is a physical and logical interface defined in the original IEEE 802.3 standard for 10BASE5 Ethernet and the previous DIX standard. The physical interface consists of a 15-pin D-subminiature connection that provides a path between an Ethernet node's physical signaling and the Medium Attachment Unit (MAU), sometimes also known as a transceiver. On Ethernet implementations without separate MAU and MAC, the AUI is omitted.

AUI connectors became rare beginning in the early 1990s when computers and hubs began to incorporate the MAU, particularly as the 10BASE-T standard became more common and use of 10BASE5 (thicknet) and 10BASE2 (thinnet) declined. The electrical AUI connection was still present inside the equipment. With the introduction of Fast Ethernet the AUI became obsolete, and was replaced by the Media Independent Interface (MII). Gigabit Ethernet and 10 Gigabit Ethernet have respectively the GMII and XGMII interfaces.

A modified form using a smaller connector called the AAUI was introduced on Apple Macintosh computers in 1991, and its use discontinued in 1998.

Connector and signals 

An AUI connector is a DA-15 (D-subminiature). It has a sliding clip in place of the thumbscrews normally found on a D-connector to hold two connectors together. This clip permits the MAU and MAC to be directly attached to one another even when their size and shape would preclude the use of thumbscrews. This clip is however frequently found to be awkward and/or unreliable.

See also 
 XAUI
 Apple Attachment Unit Interface

References 

Ethernet
Computer connectors